Dolichoderus brevipalpis is an extinct species of ant in the genus Dolichoderus. Described by Dlussky in 2008, the ant is from the Eocene  epoch, being discovered in the Baltic Amber.

References

†
Eocene insects
Prehistoric insects of Europe
Fossil taxa described in 2008
Fossil ant taxa